Kalban or Al Kalban is a community on Masirah Island in Masirah Province, Ash Sharqiyah South Governorate, Oman.

References

 http://www.maplandia.com/oman/a-sharqiya/masirah/kalban/

Ash Sharqiyah South Governorate